Sabrina Barm (born 2 March 1987) is a German female canoeist who won three medals at senior level at the Wildwater Canoeing World Championships.

Medals at the World Championships
Senior

References

External links
 

1987 births
Living people
German female canoeists
Place of birth missing (living people)